Peter Feeney was County Councillor and Mayor of County Galway, Ireland in 2008-09.

Feeney won against the only other candidate, Seán Ó Tuairisg. Feeney had been a Fine Gael councillor for Athenry since 2003, after taking the seat vacated by Ulick Burke.

External links
 https://web.archive.org/web/20100821114144/http://www.galway.ie/en/AboutYourCouncil/Councillors/MeettheCouncillors/Name,594,en.html
 https://archive.today/20130107201255/http://www.photos.galwaynews.ie/4046-cllr-peter-feeney-elected-county-mayor
 

Politicians from County Galway
Living people
Fine Gael politicians
Local councillors in County Galway
Year of birth missing (living people)